Deutsche Presse-Agentur GmbH (dpa) is a German news agency founded in 1949. Based in Hamburg, it has grown to be a major worldwide operation serving print media, radio, television, online, mobile phones, and national news agencies. News is available in seven languages, among them German, English, Spanish and Arabic.

The dpa is the largest press agency in Germany with headquarters in Hamburg and the central editorial office in Berlin. It is represented abroad with around 100 locations and maintains 12 state services in Germany with the corresponding offices. The dpa has 660 employees, the turnover was 101 million euros in 2021.

History
The dpa was founded as a co-operative in Goslar on 18 August 1949 and became a limited liability company in 1951. Fritz Sänger was the first editor-in-chief. He served as managing director until 1955 and as managing editor until 1959. The first transmission occurred at 6 a.m. on 1 September 1949.

In 1986, the dpa founded Global Media Services (GMS), which bought its competitor Cartography Service GmbH in 1988.

In 2010, the editorial headquarters moved to the historical newspaper district of Berlin, location of the former newsroom for Hamburg, Frankfurt, and Berlin. The corporate headquarters remain in Hamburg, along with subsidiaries news aktuell GmbH, dpa-media technology GmbH, and dpa-infocom GmbH.

Services

German language services 
dpa main wire and dpa regional services publish around 1,100 articles daily from all over the world in the politics, business, sports and panorama sections. An average of 1,000 photos are offered to customers daily via Bildfunk.

dpa customers are offered these services for a flat monthly fee (graded according to the size of the medium).

Foreign language services 
dpa foreign language services are available in English, Spanish and Arabic. The English service is produced in Berlin and Sydney, the Spanish service in Madrid and Berlin, the Arabic service has its main editorial office in Cairo.

The dpa cooperates with other news agencies, including Associated Press (AP), Austria Presse-Agentur, DPA-AFX Business News, and Schweizerische Depeschenagentur.

See also 

List of news agencies

References

External links

 Official website

Companies based in Hamburg
Mass media in Hamburg
News agencies based in Germany
Mass media companies established in 1949
1949 establishments in West Germany